Dan O'Neill (Daniel T. O'Neill) is an Alaskan writer. Born in San Francisco, California, in 1950, Dan O'Neill came to Alaska in the 1970s. Settling in Fairbanks, he did a variety of things, such as building log cabins, dog mushing, working as a laborer, conducting oral history interviews, and as a producer of radio, television, and video productions dealing with history, science, and politics. Now a full-time writer, he is the author of three Alaskan themed books. From 1985 to 1995 he worked for the Oral History Program at the University of Alaska Fairbanks, including doing project interviews about the Yukon-Charley Rivers National Preserve, digitized at Project Jukebox. These interviews formed the basis of his book A Land Gone Lonesome, which was awarded an "Editor's Choice" at The New York Times Book Review.  He was an opinion columnist for the Fairbanks Daily News-Miner from 1998 to 2002.  O'Neill twice won the Alaska Library Associations's "Alaskana of the Year Award" for the best book on Alaska published anywhere.  He also was named Alaska Historian of the Year by the Alaska Historical Society.  In 2015, the University of Alaska Press published his first book for children, Stubborn Gal: The True Story of an Undefeated Sled Dog Racer.

Bibliography 
 Stubborn Gal: The True Story of an Undefeated Sled Dog Racer (2015)
 A Land Gone Lonesome: An Inland Voyage Along the Yukon River (2006)
 The Last Giant of Beringia: The Mystery of the Bering Land Bridge (2004).
 The Firecracker Boys: H-bombs, Inupiat Eskimos, and the Roots of the Environmental Movement (1994, ; 2007).

References 

Year of birth missing (living people)
Living people
American male journalists
Writers from Fairbanks, Alaska